The Man Who Changed His Name is a 1928 British silent mystery film directed by A. V. Bramble and starring Stewart Rome, Betty Faire and James Raglan. It is an adaptation of the play of the same title by Edgar Wallace. It was made at Beaconsfield Studios. The screenplay concerns a young woman who comes to suspect that her husband may in fact be a Canadian fugitive from justice, who murdered his last wife.

Cast
 Stewart Rome as Selby Clive 
 Betty Faire as Nita Clive 
 James Raglan as Frank O'Ryan 
 Ben Field as Sir Ralph Whitcombe 
 Wallace Bosco as Jerry Muller 
 Douglas Payne as A Canadian

References

Bibliography
 Wood, Linda. British Films 1927-1939. British Film Institute, 1986.

External links

1928 films
British mystery films
British silent feature films
1928 mystery films
Films directed by A. V. Bramble
Films shot at Beaconsfield Studios
Films set in England
British films based on plays
Films based on works by Edgar Wallace
British black-and-white films
1920s English-language films
1920s British films
Silent mystery films